Denis Whitburn (born 13 September 1944) is an Australian film writer and producer.

Selected credits
Crosstalk (1982) - writer
 The Last Bastion (1984) - writer, producer
Breaking Loose (1988) - script editor
Bodysurfer (1989) (mini series) - writer
 Blood Oath (1990) - writer, producer
Sher Mountain Killings Mystery (1990) - writer
Bony (TV series) (1992) - writer of episode
 Billy's Holiday (1995) - writer, producer
Elephant Princess (1996) - writer

References

External links
 Denis Whitburn at Austlit
 

Australian screenwriters
Australian film producers
1944 births
Living people